Donna Arlene Atwood (February 14, 1925 – December 20, 2010) was an American figure skater. She was born in Newton, Kansas, to pharmacist Chester Atwood and Allie Atwood, his wife. The family moved to Albuquerque before relocating to Los Angeles when she was 9. She died on December 30, 2010, aged 85, at the Motion Picture & Television Country House and Hospital in Woodland Hills, California.

Career
Donna began taking dancing lessons at age 3. Her skating began at age 13, when she was inspired by seeing a Sonja Henie ice show, and was given her first pair of skates by her older brother. At age 15, she won two medals at the 1941 U.S. Figure Skating Championships: the senior pairs title  with partner Eugene Turner., and the junior ladies title.

That same year, John H. Harris, operating owner of the Ice Capades, offered her a contract with his show. She signed with the Ice Capades at age 16, and within a year she was its star, billed as "The Queen of the Ice". She toured with the show for fifteen years, giving over 6,000 performances in two dozen venues. She was so famous that newspaper headlines of the day referred to her only as "Donna". On her farewell tour, she starred in a production of Peter Pan, making her entrance flying above the audience. She often spoke of it as her favorite role.

Donna Atwood retired from the role of lead skater in 1956 at age 31, moving into a custom-built Beverly Hills home complete with a piano that folded into the wall. She made a single television appearance in 1961 as Phyllis Merrill in the Perry Mason episode, "The Case of the Renegade Refugee."

In the 1970s, when her children were grown and she was "tired of doing nothing," she began coaching young figure skaters in California.

Family life
In 1949, Donna married her mentor John H. Harris, 27 years her senior, with whom she had twin sons in 1950 and a daughter in 1952.

To facilitate her travel with young children, the Ice Capades props department used a 10-foot traveling trunk to build a portable nursery that could be rolled into her hotel room. When her sons reached school age, she retired from skating. She was 31 years old, and at the peak of her career.

Atwood and Harris divorced in 1959. Donna never remarried, eventually moving to Marina del Rey and Palm Desert, California.

Results
(pairs with Eugene Turner)

References

External links
 

1925 births
2010 deaths
American female pair skaters
21st-century American women
20th-century American women